The Diocese of León is a diocese located in the city of León in the ecclesiastical province of Oviedo in Spain.

History
 4th century: Established as Diocese of León

Special churches
Minor Basilicas:
Real Basílica de San Isidoro de León, León

Bishops of León

  (deposed 254)
 Savinus (254–???)
 ...
  (fl. 315)
 ...
 Suintila (792)
 Quintila (811-820)
 Cixila I (853-855)
 Frunimio I (854–874), first bishop of León.
 Mauro (878–886)
 Vincent (899–900)
  (900–904)
 Sisnando (905–914?)
 Cixila II (911914/15). Died in 938. Retired in 916 to the Monastery of San Cosme y San Damián in Abellar (León) which he had founded.
 Frunimio II (915–924)
Oveco Núñez (927–950), Carriedo Tejedo calls him the 6th Bishop
Gonzalo (950/1966)
Velasco (966973/4)
Sisnando Puricélliz (974–980), possibly brother of noblemen Sancho and Aznar Puricélliz
Velasco (again, 980/1)
Sisnando Baroncélliz (981/2)
Sabarico (981/2)
Fortis (fl. 984)
Sabarico (again, 985–991)
Fruela (991/21006)
 Nuño (1007–1026)
 Servando (1026–1040)
 Cipriano (1040–1057)
Aloito (1057–1063)
 Pelayo Tedóniz (1065– )
Pedro I (c.10871111/2)
Maurice Bourdin (1111–1112/3), usurped the see from Pedro for a brief time
Diego (1112/31130)
Arias Gundesíndiz (1130–1135)
Pedro (II) Anáyaz (1135–1139)
Juan Albertínez (1139–1181)
Manrique de Lara (1181–1205)
Pedro Muñiz (May 12051206/07), appointed archbishop of Santiago de Compostela in early 1207. Died on 29 January 1224.
Pelayo Pérez (February 12071208), died before consecration
Rodrigo Álvarez (1208–1232)
Martín Alonso (1232–1234)
Arnaldo (1234–1235)
Juan (1237–1238)
Martín Arias (1238–1242)
Nuño Álvarez (1242–1252)
Martín Fernández (1254–1289)
Fernando Ruiz de Cabañas (1289–1301)
Gonzalo de Hinojosa (6 November 130112 July 1313 appointed Bishop of Burgos), died on 15 May 1327
Juan Soares (1313)
Juan Fernández (1316), elect
Sede vacanta (1316–1318)
García de Ayerbe (April 1318 – 4 September 1332)
Juan del Campo (2 December 133224 May 1344 Died)
Diego Ramírez de Guzmán (1344–1354)
Pedro Raimundo (1354–1360)
Pedro de Barreira, O.S.A. (31 August 136019 November 1361 Appointed, Bishop of Toul)
Alfonso (1375–1376)
 (1376–1378)
Fernando (1378–1380])
Aleramo (1382–1401?)
 (1403–1415), transferred to Palencia
 (1415–1418), transferred to Cuenca
Juan Rodríguez Villalón (1418)
 (1424–1435)
Giovanni Berardi (1435–1437), in commendam
Juan de Mella (12 April 1434Did Not Take Effect)
...
Juan de Pontibus (ca. 1446)
Pedro Cabeza de Vaca (1448–1459)
 (1460)
Juan de Torquemada, O.P. (31 July 146026 January 1463 Appointed, Bishop of Orense)
Giacopo Antonio Venier (16 September 14646 October 1469 Appointed, Bishop of Cuenca)
Rodrigo de Vergara (6 October 146918 June 1478 Died)
Luis Velasco (1478–1484 Appointed Bishop of Córdoba)
Iñigo Manrique de Lara (bishop) (1484–1485 Appointed Bishop of Córdoba)
Alonso de Valdivieso (148521 May 1500 Died)
Francisco Desprats (4 December 150010 September 1504 Died)
Juan de Vera (14 May 15054 May 1507 Died)
Francesco Alidosi (150724 May 1511 Died)
Luigi d'Aragona (6 June 1511 – 17 December 1516 Resigned)
Esteban Gabriel Merino (17 December 151612 June 1523 Appointed, Bishop of Jaén)
Pedro Manuel (12 June 152317 June 1534 Appointed, Bishop of Zamora)
Pedro Alvarez de Acosta (8 January 153521 May 1539 Appointed, Bishop of Osma)
Fernando Valdés (30 May 153929 October 1539 Appointed, Bishop of Sigüenza)
Sebastián Ramírez de Fuenleal (29 October 15392 June 1542 Appointed, Bishop of Cuenca)
Esteban Almeida (2 June 154216 April 1546 Appointed, Bishop of Cartagena)
Juan Fernández Temiño (19 July 15469 November 1556 Died)
Andrés de la Cuesta (10 December 15571564 Died)
Juan de San Millán (28 July 156411 April 1578 Died)
Francisco Trujillo Garcia (5 September 157814 November 1592 Died)
Juan Alonso Moscoso (30 August 15939 May 1603 Appointed, Bishop of Malaga)
Andrés de Casso, O.P. (12 June 160313 May 1607 Died)
Francisco Terrones del Caño (3 March 160813 March 1613 Died)
Alonso González Aguilar (23 September 16132 December 1615 Died)
Juan Llano Valdés (5 September 16169 August 1622 Died)
Juan Molina Alvarez (20 March 1623Nov 1623 Died)
Gregorio Pedrosa Cásares, O.S.H. (16 September 162431 January 1633 Appointed, Bishop of Valladolid)
Bartolomé Santos de Risoba (26 September 16339 December 1649 Confirmed, Bishop of Sigüenza)
Juan del Pozo Horta, O.P. (10 January 165028 August 1656 Confirmed, Bishop of Segovia)
Juan Pérez de Vega (López de Vega) (18 September 165614 September 1659 Died)
Juan Bravo Lasprilla (7 June 166031 July 1662 Appointed, Bishop of Cartagena)
Juan Vande-Escarth y Briceño, O.S.H. (12 January 16656 April 1672 Died)
Juan Álvarez Osorio (12 December 167222 January 1680 Appointed, Bishop of Plasencia)
Juan Aparicio Navarro (7 October 16806 November 1696 Died)
José Gregorio de Rojas y Velázquez (3 June 16977 April 1704 Appointed, Bishop of Plasencia)
Manuel Pérez Araciel y Rada (28 April 170413 June 1714 Confirmed, Archbishop of Zaragoza)
José Ulzurrun de Asanza y Civera (17 September 171417 April 1718 Died)
Martín Zalayeta Lizarza (27 May 172011 September 1728 Died)
Juan Fernández Zapata (3 August 172912 October 1729 Died)
Francisco de la Torre Herrera (24 July 17301 February 1735 Died)
José de Llupiá y Roger, O.S.B. (19 December 173521 November 1752 Died)
Alfonso Fernández Pantoja (9 April 17536 November 1761 Died)
Pascual de los Herreros (23 August 17623 March 1770 Died)
Baltasar Yusta y Navarro (10 September 177017 February 1777 Appointed, Bishop of Córdoba)
Cayetano Antonio Cuadrillero Mota (15 December 17773 April 1800 Died)
Pedro Luis Blanco (11 August 180022 November 1811 Died)
Ignacio Ramón Roda (19 December 18144 January 1823 Died)
Joaquín Abarca Blanque (27 September 182421 June 1844 Died)
Joaquín Barbajero y Villar (17 January 184826 February 1863 Died)
Calixto Castrillo y Ornedo (1 October 186319 September 1869 Died)
Saturnino Fernandez de Castro y de la Cotera (5 July 187515 March 1883 Appointed, Bishop of Burgos)
Francisco Xavier Caminero y Muñoz (27 March 188513 April 1885 Died)
Francisco Gómez-Salazar y Lucio-Villegas (10 June 18861 October 1904 Retired)
Juan Manuel Sanz y Saravia (27 March 190529 April 1909 Appointed, Bishop of Jaén)
Ramón Guillamet y Coma (29 April 190918 July 1913 Appointed, Bishop of Córdoba)
José Álvarez y Miranda (18 July 19134 March 1937 Died)
Carmelo Ballester y Nieto, C.M. (12 February 193810 June 1943 Appointed, Bishop of Vitoria)
Luis Almarcha Hernández (10 July 19444 April 1970 Retired)
Luis María de Larrea y Legarreta (9 July 197116 February 1979 Appointed, Bishop of Bilbao)
Fernando Sebastián Aguilar, C.M.F. (22 August 197928 July 1983 Resigned)
Juan Angel Belda Dardiñá (28 July 19839 February 1987 Resigned)
Antonio Vilaplana Molina (9 February 198719 March 2002 Retired)
Julián López Martín (19 March 2002 Appointed21 October 2020 Retired)
Luis Ángel de las Heras Berzal (21 October 2020 Appointed )

See also
Roman Catholicism in Spain
 Kingdom of León
 Leonese language

References

Bibliography

External links
 
 Catholic Hierarchy

Roman Catholic dioceses in Spain
Dioceses established in the 4th century